South Africa is a single by Ian Gillan and former Whitesnake guitarist Bernie Marsden. It was released in 1988 in UK by Virgin Records to coincide with the Nelson Mandela 70th birthday concert at Wembley Stadium. The single was mixed by Jimbo Barton.

Track listing
 7" single
 "South Africa" (Marsden) – 4:03
 "John" (Gillan) – 4:44

 12" single
 "South Africa – 12" extended version" (Marsden) – 7.18
 "South Africa" (Marsden) – 4:03

Personnel
 Ian Gillan – vocals, harmonica
 Bernie Marsden – guitars
 Jimmy Copley – drums

Production notes
 "John" recorded live at 214 Oxford Street, London
 Produced by Ian Gillan
 Engineered by Nick Davis 
 Mixed by Jimbo Barton

References

1988 singles
Virgin Records singles
Songs written by Bernie Marsden
1988 songs